The Premio de Narrativa Breve Ribera del Duero is a bi-annual Spanish-language literary award for a short story collection. The award amount is  making it the largest in the world for an award of this kind. The award is open to authors of any nationality writing in Spanish. The award was established in 2008 by the Consejo Regulador de la Denominación de Origen Ribera del Duero (Regulating Council of the Ribera del Duero), a region in Spain.

Winners
2009 Javier Sáez de Ibarra (Spain) for Mirar al agua, cuentos plásticos 
2011 Marcos Giralt Torrente (Spain) for El final del amor 
2013 Guadalupe Nettel (Mexico) for El matrimonio de los peces rojos 
2015 Samanta Schweblin (Argentina) for Siete casas vacías 
2017 Antonio Ortuño (Mexico) for La vaga ambición 
2020 Marcelo Luján (Argentina) for La claridad

References

External links
Premio de Narrativa Breve Ribera del Duero

2008 establishments in Spain
Awards established in 2008
Spanish literary awards
Short story awards